Jeannette Ehlers (born 1973) is a Danish-Trinidadian artist based in Copenhagen. Her work often addresses themes and questions around memory, race and colonialism. She is well-known for co-creating the public art project, a monumental public sculpture, I Am Queen Mary with La Vaugh Belle in 2018. It is the first public statue of a Black woman in Denmark and depicts Mary Thomas, leader of the 1878 St. Croix labor riot.

Reference

External links
 
 I Am Queen Mary artwork website

Caribbean artists
Danish artists
Living people
1973 births
Place of birth missing (living people)